The following is the final results of the 1979 Asian Wrestling Championships.

Medal table

Team ranking

Medal summary

Men's freestyle

References

External links
UWW Database

Asia
W
Asian Wrestling Championships
Sport in Jalandhar
International wrestling competitions hosted by India